Gustave Courbet (1819–1877) was a French painter.

Courbet may also refer to:

Courbet (surname), including a list of people with the name
French ship Courbet
 French ironclad Courbet
 French battleship Courbet (1911)
 French frigate Courbet, a French frigate
 Courbet Peninsula, a peninsula in the northeastern portion of the island of Kerguelen
 8238 Courbet, a main-belt asteroid
 Courbet (company), a French jewelry maison
 Zemmouri, a town in Algeria formerly named Courbet between 1886 and 1962